Hunchback (shown as Hunch Back on the title screen) is a video game developed by Century Electronics and published in arcades in 1983. The game is loosely based on the 1831 Victor Hugo novel The Hunchback of Notre Dame and the player controls Quasimodo. Set on top of a castle wall, the player must guide the Hunchback from left to right while avoiding obstacles on a series of non-scrolling screens. The goal of each screen is to ring the church bell at the far right.

Gameplay

Obstacles include pits which must be swung over on a long rope, ramparts which must be jumped (some of which contain knights with spears) and flying fireballs and arrows (to be ducked or jumped). To impose a time limit on each screen a knight climbs the wall, costing the player a life should he reach the top.  Eventually, after completing a number of screens, the player must rescue Esmeralda. If this final screen is completed, the game begins again at a faster speed.

Development
The hunchback character was originally to be Robin Hood, hence the green costume and the game stages with arrows. The artist who drew the Robin Hood character left the company before the decision to change the theme to Hunchback. By the time a new artist was taken on, the green costume had become accepted and no-one questioned it (someone commented that the Robin Hood character, as drawn, looked like a hunchback).

Ports
Ports were released in 1984 by Ocean Software for the Acorn Electron, Amstrad CPC, Commodore 64, VIC-20, Dragon 32, Oric, and ZX Spectrum. It was Ocean's first arcade port. It reached number one in the UK sales charts.

A version released by Superior Software for the BBC Micro in 1984 was originally an unofficial clone. When Ocean acquired the home computer rights to the game they reached an agreement so that Ocean could release the Acorn Electron conversion which had been developed. Superior continued to sell the BBC Micro version and released both versions on their Play It Again Sam 6 compilation in 1988. An MSX port was published in 1985.

Legacy
The home ports inspired two sequels: Hunchback II: Quasimodo's Revenge and Hunchback: The Adventure, which were released by Ocean for the ZX Spectrum and Commodore 64.

Clones released for 8-bit computers are Quasimodo (1983) from Synapse Software for the Atari 8-bit family and The Great Wall (1986) from Artic Computing for the Acorn Electron and BBC Micro.

References

External links

1983 video games
Amstrad CPC games
Arcade video games
BBC Micro and Acorn Electron games
Commodore 64 games
VIC-20 games
Dragon 32 games
Oric games
MSX games
ZX Spectrum games
Superior Software games
Ocean Software games
Works based on The Hunchback of Notre-Dame
Video games set in castles
Video games developed in the United Kingdom